Patrick Carlin  VC (1832 – 11 May 1895), of Belfast, County Antrim, was an Irish recipient of the Victoria Cross, the highest and most prestigious award for gallantry in the face of the enemy that can be awarded to British and Commonwealth forces.

VC action
When Carlin was approximately 26 years old, he was serving as a private in the 13th (1st Somersetshire) (Prince Albert's Light Infantry) Regiment of Foot of the British Army during the Indian Mutiny when on 6 April 1858 at Azumgurh, India, he did the deed for which he was awarded the Victoria Cross:

Further information
He died in the Belfast Union Infirmary on 11 May 1895, and was buried in the Friar's Bush graveyard on Stranmillis Road, Belfast; he has no memorial. The Board of Guardians Minute Book records that he died of exhaustion at the age of 60 on 11 May 1895. Although he is believed to be buried in Friar's Bush graveyard, there is a view that his grave might be in one of the two sections of the old Donegall Road (Blackstaff Road) graveyard; now taken over by new housing and the Arellian Nursery ground.

His Victoria Cross is displayed at The Somerset Light Infantry Museum, Taunton, Somerset.

References

The Register of the Victoria Cross (1981, 1988 and 1997)

Ireland's VCs (Dept of Economic Development, 1995)
Monuments to Courage (David Harvey, 1999)
Irish Winners of the Victoria Cross (Richard Doherty & David Truesdale, 2000)

External links
Location of grave and VC medal (Belfast, Northern Ireland)

Indian Rebellion of 1857 recipients of the Victoria Cross
Irish recipients of the Victoria Cross
Somerset Light Infantry soldiers
1832 births
1895 deaths
19th-century Irish people
Irish soldiers in the British Army
Military personnel from Belfast
British Army recipients of the Victoria Cross